Joseph Allard (December 31, 1910 – May 3, 1991) was a professor of saxophone and clarinet at the Juilliard School, the New England Conservatory, and the Manhattan School of Music. He also held adjunct positions at many other schools. He succeeded Vincent J. Abato as the saxophone instructor at Juilliard in 1956 and held that position until the end of the 1983–84 school year. Allard was the first saxophonist with the NBC staff orchestra in New York City, and played on "Firestone Hour" and "Bell Telephone Hour" on TV and radio. He played with Red Nichols and the Five Pennies, played for a brief period with Red Norvo's orchestra, was the saxophone section coach for the Glenn Miller Orchestra and the Benny Goodman Orchestra, and played bass clarinet in the NBC Symphony Orchestra under Arturo Toscanini from 1949-54. He was a native of Lowell, MA.

Allard studied clarinet under Gaston Hamelin of the Boston Symphony and saxophone under Lyle Bowen, and taught many famous students, including Michael Brecker, Eddie Daniels, Bob Berg, Dave Tofani, Dave Liebman, Paul Winter, Jordan Penkower, Victor Morosco, Eric Dolphy, Harvey Pittel, Col Loughnan, Paul Cohen, Anders Paulsson and Kenneth Radnofsky.

References
 The Joe Allard Project
 Debra McKim, "Joseph Allard: His Contributions to Saxophone Pedagogy and Performance," (DMA diss., University of Northern Colorado, 2000)
 James Dawson, "In Memoriam, Joseph Allard (1910–1991)," Saxophone Symposium 16, No. 4 (Fall 1991): 14–19.
 David Demsey, “The Saxophone at Juilliard,” Saxophone Journal 24, No. 6 (July 2000): 59–61.
 David Liebman, "Developing a Personal Saxophone Sound," (Medfield, MA: Dorn Publications, 1989).
 Paul Piersall, "Joe Allard," Saxophone Journal 13, No. 1 (Spring 1988): 12–22.

1910 births
1991 deaths
American classical saxophonists
American male saxophonists
American jazz saxophonists
American classical clarinetists
Juilliard School faculty
American music educators
Musicians from Lowell, Massachusetts
20th-century classical musicians
20th-century American saxophonists
Jazz musicians from Massachusetts
Classical musicians from Massachusetts
20th-century American male musicians
American male jazz musicians